This is a list of countries  and territories with a flag that incorporates the Islamic symbols including the Shahada, takbir, Hilal and Arkān al-Islām. It also includes overseas territories, provinces and states, but does not include countries which have Pan-Arab colors only. Not all countries have a Muslim majority.

Current

Sovereign countries

Regional provinces, territories and states

Former 

Islamic symbols
Religious flags
National symbols of Algeria
National symbols of Afghanistan
National symbols of Azerbaijan
National symbols of Bahrain
National symbols of Brunei
National symbols of the Comoros
National symbols of Iran
National symbols of Iraq
National symbols of Libya
National symbols of Malaysia
National symbols of the Maldives
National symbols of Mauritania
National symbols of Morocco
National symbols of Saudi Arabia
National symbols of Singapore
National symbols of Turkey
National symbols of Tunisia
National symbols of Turkmenistan
National symbols of Uzbekistan
Islamic symbols
Islam-related lists